Mário Sérgio Santos Costa (born 29 May 1990), commonly known as Marinho, is a Brazilian footballer who plays as a forward for Flamengo.

Marinho began his career at Fluminense, and subsequently represented several teams in his home country before impressing with Vitória in 2016. He then moved to Chinese club Changchun Yatai in 2017, but returned to Brazil in the following year with Grêmio. After moving to Santos in 2019, he enjoyed a prolific 2020 season, earning several individual awards such as the South American Footballer of the Year. In 2022, he moved to Flamengo.

Club career

Early career
Marinho was born in Penedo, Alagoas, and played for Penedense, Corinthians-AL and Fluminense's youth categories. He made his first team debut on 30 March 2008, coming on as a second half substitute for David in a 1–3 home loss against Botafogo for the Campeonato Carioca championship. His first Série A match occurred on 11 May, replacing Tartá in a 0–0 away draw against Atlético Mineiro.

Internacional and loans
On 30 December 2008, Marinho signed a five-year deal with fellow top tier club Internacional. Making his debut the following 5 February in a 4–1 Campeonato Gaúcho home routing of Canoas, he was only used rarely during his spell at the club.

In 2011, Marinho served loan stints at Caxias and Paraná, respectively. He scored his first senior goal with the latter on 22 October, in a 3–4 Série B loss at Ponte Preta.

Marinho was again loaned out in the following years, representing Goiás in 2012 and Ituano in 2013.

Náutico / Ceará
On 8 January 2014, Marinho signed permanently for Náutico. He was sparingly used during his time at the club, scoring his first goal for Timbu in a 3–1 win at Salgueiro for the Campeonato Pernambucano on 27 March.

On 23 December 2014, Marinho's agent confirmed his agreement with Ceará for the following campaign. He scored his first goal for the club on 11 March 2015, the game's only in a Copa do Nordeste home success over Ríver.

Marinho scored two goals in his first four league matches for Vovô. In his fifth, a 3–3 home draw against Santa Cruz, he scored a double, but gained national recognition due to his live post-match interview, where he said a bad word after knowing he was suspended for the following match due to a celebration in one of the goals and became a national meme.

Cruzeiro
On 26 June 2015, after his notable interview, Marinho was touted to a possible move to Cruzeiro in the main category. Three days later he agreed to a three-year contract at the club, for a fee of R$ 1.2 million for 50% of his federative rights.

Marinho made his debut for the club on 4 July 2015, replacing Marquinhos and scoring the last in a 2–0 home win against Atlético Paranaense. However, he failed to find the net in the following eleven matches for the club.

Vitória
On 25 January 2016, Marinho signed a one-year loan deal with newly promoted Vitória. He made his debut for the club five days later, scoring in a 3–0 home win against Jacuipense.

One of the club's key units during the first half of the campaign, Marinho signed a permanent contract with Vitória on 18 June 2016. On 6 November, he scored a brace in a 3–2 home win against Atlético Paranaense.

Changchun Yatai
On 21 January 2017, Marinho was presented at Chinese Super League side Changchun Yatai, for a rumoured fee of R$ 17 million. He struggled to adapt at the club, scoring only three goals in 22 appearances.

Grêmio
On 28 June 2018, Marinho returned to Brazil and signed a three-and-a-half-year contract with Grêmio. An immediate backup to starting trio Luan, Everton and Jael, he fell further down the pecking order after the arrivals of Diego Tardelli, André and Felipe Vizeu.

Santos

On 25 May 2019, Marinho signed for Santos until December 2022, with David Braz moving in the opposite direction. He made his debut for the club on 2 June, replacing goalscorer Eduardo Sasha in a 1–0 away defeat of former club Ceará.

Marinho scored his first goal for Peixe on 21 July 2019, netting the game's only in an away defeat of Botafogo. After spending the first months of the 2020 campaign sidelined due to a fractured foot, he scored a career-best 22 goals in the year, being the club's top goalscorer.

On 24 February 2021, Marinho tested positive for COVID-19, being sidelined for the last round of the season and for the start of the 2021 Campeonato Paulista.

Flamengo
On 28 January 2022, Marinho was announced as the new signing of Flamengo, agreeing to a two-year deal.

Career statistics

Honours
Internacional
Campeonato Gaúcho: 2009

Grêmio
Campeonato Gaúcho: 2019

Goiás
Campeonato Goiano: 2012
Campeonato Brasileiro Série B: 2012

Ceará
Copa do Nordeste: 2015

Vitória
Campeonato Baiano: 2016

Flamengo
Copa do Brasil: 2022
 Copa Libertadores: 2022
Individual
Copa do Brasil top goalscorer: 2016
Copa Libertadores Best Eleven: 2020
Copa Libertadores Best of the Tournament: 2020
Campeonato Brasileiro Série A Team of the Year: 2020
Bola de Prata: 2020
South American Footballer of the Year: 2020

References

External links

1990 births
Living people
Sportspeople from Alagoas
Brazilian footballers
Association football forwards
Campeonato Brasileiro Série A players
Campeonato Brasileiro Série B players
Campeonato Brasileiro Série C players
Chinese Super League players
Fluminense FC players
Sport Club Internacional players
Sociedade Esportiva e Recreativa Caxias do Sul players
Paraná Clube players
Goiás Esporte Clube players
Ituano FC players
Clube Náutico Capibaribe players
Ceará Sporting Club players
Cruzeiro Esporte Clube players
Esporte Clube Vitória players
Grêmio Foot-Ball Porto Alegrense players
Santos FC players
CR Flamengo footballers
 Copa Libertadores-winning players
Changchun Yatai F.C. players
Brazilian expatriate footballers
Expatriate footballers in China
Brazilian expatriate sportspeople in China